Attorney General Mitchell may refer to:

Bob Mitchell (Saskatchewan politician) (1936–2016), Attorney General of Saskatchewan
David Brydie Mitchell (1760–1837), Attorney General of Georgia
Henry Mitchell (Irish judge) (died 1384), Attorney General for Ireland
John H. Mitchell (Iowa Attorney General) (1899–1992), Attorney General of Iowa
John N. Mitchell (1913–1988), Attorney General of the United States
Samuel James Mitchell (1852–1926), Attorney General of South Australia
Tom Mitchell (Australian politician) (1906–1984), Attorney-General of Victoria
William D. Mitchell (1874–1955), Attorney General of the United States